Joseph Micchia (born December 30, 1966) is a former NAIA Division II All-American quarterback at Westminster College (Pennsylvania). In 2013, he was inducted into the College Football Hall of Fame.

References

1966 births
Living people
American football quarterbacks
Westminster Titans football players
College Football Hall of Fame inductees